Manitoba Pool Elevators was a grain trade company founded in 1924. It became a subsidiary of the Saskatchewan Wheat Pool until November 1932, when the Pool declared bankruptcy. In 1998 Alberta Wheat Pool and Manitoba Pool Elevators merged to form Agricore Cooperative Limited. In 2001, United Grain Growers combined its business operations with Agricore Cooperative Ltd. and carried on business as Agricore United, a publicly traded company, no longer a farmer-owned cooperative. In 2007, Agricore United was taken over by the Saskatchewan Wheat Pool, another publicly traded company. The merged corporation was renamed Viterra.

Gallery

See also 
 Wheat pool
 Alberta Wheat Pool
 Agricore United
 Saskatchewan Wheat Pool
 United Grain Growers
 Viterra
 List of Canadian Heritage Wheat Varieties

References

External links
Manitoba Wheat Pool
 Smokylake.com's history of Canadian wheat prices
 Grain Elevators Canada

Companies based in Manitoba
Agricultural cooperatives in Canada
Wheat production in Canada
Agricultural marketing cooperatives
Defunct companies of Manitoba
Companies disestablished in 1998
Former cooperatives of Canada
1988 disestablishments in Manitoba

Agricultural organizations based in Manitoba